Canada competed at the 2017 World Games in Wroclaw, Poland, from July 20, 2017 to July 30, 2017.

Competitors

Air Sports

Sven Jseppi finished 19th in the Parachuting - Canopy Piloting event.

Boules Sports
Canada  has qualified at the 2017 World Games:

Petanque Women's Singles Precision Shooting - 1 quota

Bowling

François Lavoie and Dan Maclelland won the gold medal in Men's Doubles.

Gymnastic

Trampoline
Canada has qualified at the 2017 World Games:

Men's Individual Double Mini Trampoline - 1 quota 
Men's Individual Tumbling - 1 quota 
Women's Individual Double Mini Trampoline - 1 quota
Woen's Individual Tumbling - 1 quota

Kickboxing

Jason Hinds won the silver medal in Men's K1 -67 kg event. Scott Bartlett also represented Canada in Men's -91 kg event.

Lacrosse
Canada won silver in women's lacrosse, losing to U.S. 11-8 in the final. 2017 was the first year that the World Games included any version of lacrosse.

Muaythai

Janice Lyn represented Canada in Women's 57 kg event.

Powerlifting

Ryan Stinn finished 6th in the Men's Super Heavyweight event. Ryan lifted 385.0 kg, 285.0 kg and 295.0 kg respectively in the squat, bench press and deadlift disciplines. His total weight of 965.0 kg was the 5th heaviest, but due to a scoring system factoring the weight of the competitor, he finished 6th in points.

Sport Climbing

Sean McColl won the bronze medal in Men's Lead event.

References 

Nations at the 2017 World Games
2017 in Canadian sports
2017